Football is the most popular sport in Costa Rica. Costa Rica has long been considered an exporter of footballers within Central America, with 19 players in European professional football leagues during 2006. The newspaper, La Nación, has prepared an annual census of these "Legionnaires" since 1994.

The main professional league in the country is Costa Rican Primera División run by UNAFUT.  There is a second-tier league, Segunda División de Costa Rica,  to which the last team of Primera is relegated after each season, and from which the champion is promoted to Primera. and a third tier league in addition to many amateur players.

Costa Rican players have made significant contributions to other nations' professional leagues, most notably the Mexican Primera Division since it became professional in 1943. These "Legionnaires" have represented the Costa Rica national football team, which most recently has included several players contracted to clubs outside Costa Rica during its 2014 FIFA World Cup qualification campaign.
On 24 June 2014, the Costa Rica team qualified for the knockout stages of the FIFA World Cup, topping a group that contained three former World Champions, beating Uruguay 3–1, Italy 1-0 and drawing their final game against England. Victory over Greece on penalties in the knock out stage secured them a place in the quarter finals. In November 2020, FIFA announced that the Bureau of Council awarded Costa Rica the hosting rights for the 2022 FIFA U-20 Women's World Cup, which was earlier to be hosted between 20 January and 6 February 2021.

League system

Stadiums in Costa Rica

See also

 Costa Rica national football team

References